Calycemorda kamerunensis is a species of beetle in the genus Calycemorda. It was discovered in 1969.

References

Mordellidae
Beetles described in 1969